Cleistochlamys is a genus of flowering plants belonging to the family Annonaceae.

Its native range is Eastern and Southern Tropical Africa.

Species:
 Cleistochlamys kirkii (Benth.) Oliv.

References

Annonaceae
Annonaceae genera